Grant Geoffrey Robinson (born 24 July 1979 in Gisborne) is a former New Zealand cricketer who played first-class and List A cricket for Northern Districts from 2001 to 2008.

A left-handed batsman, Robinson's highest first-class score was 125 not out in Northern Districts' 16-run victory over Auckland in 2002–03. He was also a leading member of the Hamilton team that dominated the Hawke Cup competition in the 2000s. In 2005–06 he scored 268 against Northland to record the second-highest score in the history of the competition.

Robinson studied Law and Commerce at Waikato University. After working in senior positions for Westpac in Auckland, in 2019 he joined the compostable-packaging company Ecoware as general manager. He has a family with his wife Anna.

References

External links
 
 Grant Robinson at CricketArchive

1979 births
Living people
New Zealand cricketers
Northern Districts cricketers
Cricketers from Gisborne, New Zealand
University of Waikato alumni
New Zealand businesspeople